= Peppers TV =

Indian Tamil-language TV channel

- Country: India
- Broadcast area: India, Asia, USA, UK, UAE,
- Headquarters: No.5, Nandanam Extension, 1st Street, First floor, Nandanam, Chennai, India

Programming
- Language: Tamil
- Picture format: 576i (SDTV), HDTV

Ownership
- Owner: Peppers Media Pvt Ltd

History
- Launched: 9 Oct 2011

Availability

Terrestrial
- DD Free dish: 58

Peppers TV is an Indian Tamil language general entertainment private broadcast television network that is owned by the Peppers Media Pvt Ltd. The channel currently broadcast from Peppers TV House, Nandanam, Chennai.

== Satellite ==
Satellite	IS-17-(66.0E)
Modulation	8PSK
Downlink polarization	Horizontal
FEC	3/4
Downlink frequency	3932 MHz
Symbol rate	18333 KSPS
